The East River Mountain Tunnel is a  vehicular tunnel that carries Interstate 77 (I-77) and U.S. Route 52 (US 52) through East River Mountain between Bluefield, West Virginia, and Rocky Gap, Virginia.

History
Construction began on August 12, 1969, and it opened on December 20, 1974. At a cost of $40 million (equivalent to $ in ), it was the most expensive construction project undertaken by the West Virginia Division of Highways at the time. The northern 51% of the tunnel is in West Virginia and the southern 49% in Virginia; Virginia shared the cost of the project.

Before the opening of the East River Mountain Tunnel, travelers wishing to cross the state line had to navigate the narrow, twisting, guardrail-less route of US 52 up and over the mountain (now designated as SR 598 and WV 598). When fog or snow was present, the journey became arduous, and the road was occasionally closed completely (particularly in the winter months) due to treacherous conditions.

Location

The East River Mountain Tunnel is one of two land vehicular tunnels in the United States that cross a state line, the other being the Cumberland Gap Tunnel.

The top of East River Mountain can be seen in the distance from Big Walker Lookout, a  observation tower built on Big Walker Mountain.

References

External links
The Big Walker and East River Mountain Tunnels - Back in Time - Highway History - FHWA
Bland County History Archives
Virginia asked to ease load restrictions in I-77 tunnels
VDOT Bristol District Info

External links

Information about I-77

Buildings and structures in Bland County, Virginia
Buildings and structures in Mercer County, West Virginia
Road tunnels in West Virginia
Road tunnels in Virginia
Interstate 77
U.S. Route 52
Transportation in Bland County, Virginia
Transportation in Mercer County, West Virginia
Tunnels completed in 1974